Gaya melon, also known as snowball melon, ghost melon, dinosaur melon, dinosaur egg melon, dino melon, and dino egg melon, is a small to medium-sized honeydew melon developed originally in Japan and Korea and now grown in China, Mexico, southern California, and South America.

Description
The rind is very thin and is ivory in color with green streaking and the interior flesh is white. They are round in shape and may be slightly oblong. The flesh is juicy and soft towards the center but crisper towards the rind. It has been described to have a mild, sweet flavor with floral notes. It is best kept at room temperature and cut melons will stay good in a refrigerator for up to 5 days.

Availability
It is available from late spring to early summer and is available at various farmers' markets and Asian markets in California and is sought after because of its unique coloring. It is also available at supermarkets in Australia, among other countries.

See also

Muskmelon
Cucumis
Melon

References

Cucumis
Melons
Japanese fruit
Fruits originating in East Asia
Edible fruits